Acacia mimica is a shrub of the genus Acacia and the subgenus Plurinerves that is endemic to south western Australia.

Description
Like most species of Acacia it has phyllodes rather than true leaves. It blooms from July to October and produces yellow flowers.

Taxonomy
There are two recognised varieties:
Acacia mimica var. angusta
Acacia mimica var. mimica

The yellow nerves on the plant make it similar in appearance to Acacia patagiata.

Distribution
It is native to an area in the Wheatbelt, Great Southern and Goldfields-Esperance regions of Western Australia where it is commonly situated on undulating sandplains, rocky ridges and hills and rises growing in clay, loam or sandy soils that can contain gravel. The range of the plant extends from around Goomalling in the north west down to around Borden in the south east and then out as far as Raavensthorpe in the east with outlying population found near Scaddan and Mount Burdett even further to the east.

See also
List of Acacia species

References

mimica
Acacias of Western Australia
Taxa named by Bruce Maslin
Plants described in 1990